The Rosary Lakes are a group of three lakes in Klamath County, Oregon, in the United States. All three lakes are within the Deschutes National Forest.

The lake group consists of Lower Rosary Lake, Middle Rosary Lake, and North Rosary Lake. The lakes were named from the fact their outlines together resemble the Rosary.

See also
List of lakes in Oregon

References

Lakes of Klamath County, Oregon
Lakes of Oregon
Deschutes National Forest